Toy Porno (also known as Toy P) is a self-released experimental art film by The Frogs. The amateur videotape was compiled in October 1993, as a gift for Kurt Cobain. It would soon become frequent viewing material on the Nirvana tour bus, and later on the Foo Fighters tour bus as well. Later, after generated copies began circulating amongst fans, the band began selling copies at shows. The tape is only available in VHS format. The band plans to release a DVD version but want to digitally re-create the compilation from the original masters and need time and funds to do so. The file is available for download online in AVI format through various outlets.

The title of the film refers to several short film sketches that feature action figures, dolls and knick-knack toys having adult conversations and performing sexual acts. The shorts sometimes use stop-motion animation. Mingled within the shorts are home videos and concert performances that include many cover songs played in a joking and spontaneous manner.

Sketches
In the Brian T. Komar Interview, Jimmy Flemion rants about the Patti Smith song, "25th Floor", satirically calling it "23rd Floor", to which the interviewer responds by proposing the interviewee is on drugs.

In Pony Killer (Bagism), the brothers Flemion use the Lennon/Ono "trash bag" technique on a young Asian girl, referring to her as "Yoko".

During a live performance of "I've Got Drugs (Out of the Mist)", Dennis Flemion berates a bumbling soundman, famously singing, "you are not getting paid tonight!"

Video order (track listing)
1. "Easy to Be Hard"† (Intro) (June 1982)
2. Animal Adventure #1
3. "Someone's Pinning Me to the Ground" (Milwaukee, 27 February 1992)
4. Animal Adventure #2
5. "Here Comes My Girl"† (Garage 1980)
6. Animal Adventure #3
7. "Mr. Right" (Milwaukee, 22 August 1991)
8. Animal Adventure #4
9. "Satan's in the Manger"
10. "Jesus Book #1-3"
11. "He's the Prince" (Minneapolis, 28 October 1984)
12. Over the Flames
13. "Been a Year Since I Had a Boy" (Living Room Tapes, 22 February 1988)
14. Dinosaurs Must Eat
15. "I've Got Drugs (Out of the Mist)" (Milwaukee, 1 November 1988)
16. T. Rex Sex
17. "Blues Jam"/"Hot Cock Annie" (Madison, 1 October 1988)
18. Toy Dog w/ Dinosaur Background
19. "White Rabbit"† (Milwaukee, 18 August 1989)
20. T.V. Nightmare
21. "I'm a Strolling Minstrel"
22. Brian T. Komar Interview Pt.1
23. Covers Medley (Milwaukee, 18 February 1989):
a. "Nightmares"†
b. "Every Rose Has Its Thorn"†
c. "Immigrant Song"†
d. "Birthday"†
e. "Stand"† / "Hang on Sloopy"† / "La Bondage"† ("La Bamba")
f. "Winchester Cathedral"†
24. Camping Trip #1
25. Camping Trip #2
26. "Yesterday"† (June 1982)
27. "I Don't Care If U Disrespect Me (Just So You Love Me)" (Philadelphia, 13 December 1991)
28. Pony Killer (Bagism)
29. "These Are the Finest Queen Boys (I've Ever Seen)" (Chicago, 11 April 1992)
30. "These Are the Finest Queen Boys (I've Ever Seen)" (Milwaukee, 27 February 1992)
31. "Smells Like Teen Spirit"/"Territorial Pissings"† (Milwaukee, 27 February 1992)
32. "Territorial Pissings"† (Chicago, 1 February 1992)
33. "When Doves Cry"† (Minneapolis, 21 August 1984)
34. Segment from the John Ankerberg Show ("Gather 'Round for Savior #2")
35. Clown of Thorns (Louisville, 9 August 1993)
36. "Easy to be Hard (Reprise)"† (June 1982)

† denotes cover song.

Soundtrack
Music from Toy Porno (later released on CD as Sad Bits and More Sad Bits) is a self-released soundtrack, chiefly composed of piano instrumentals.

Side A
the angry heavens
poisoning strangers
the first in a series of disasters
waltzing on a window ledge
lost in a snowstorm
lullaby
paper clouds
blue sunflowers
black-eyed sparrow
feathers in bloom
forbidden
a marriage of arrows
lasting kisses
cautious lovers
returning light
living in a house of secrets
burning the wedding invitations
tower of cowards
pledging his devotion to her (always)
spellbound
saddle down whinny will ya
the man you want wears cuckoo fur

Side B
waking lions
ascending stairs
exiled
twilight fears no wolf
opening windows
whirling in a dying room
two hearts parting
the mist that missed its mark
when rain reigns
the longing
the begging
the queen's escort
stairs go ech, ech, echoing on
the danger in shadows calling
children of deflowerland
le grande display of sorrow
the scolding mildly
Russia in tears
king stranger's court
if there ever was light
palace the ball on the tip of your foes
song for janice
smacking the pussys of a bonofide gangster

See also
Vieuphoria
Broken

Notes

https://web.archive.org/web/20081011193950/http://www.thefrogsarchive.com/store/toyporno.html
https://web.archive.org/web/20081203162732/http://www.thefrogsarchive.com/self-released/toyp-music.html
http://www.thefuton.com/frogs/discog.txt
https://web.archive.org/web/20071107065647/http://www.thefrogsarchive.com/collection/videos/toy-porno/insert.jpg

The Frogs (band) video albums
Puppet films
1990s English-language films